Kaława  is a village in the administrative district of Gmina Międzyrzecz, within Międzyrzecz County, Lubusz Voivodeship, in western Poland.

Geography
It is located on National road 3, a component of European route E65, which today is upgraded as the Expressway S3 bypass road.

History

The village in Greater Poland near the border with Brandenburg was mentioned in 1257 as a property of the Cistercian abbey of Gościkowo. The Gothic parish church was plundered by the Swedish troops which Field Marshal Arvid Wittenberg led into Poland during the Second Northern War in 1655 and afterwards was rebuilt in a Baroque style.

In the 1793 Second Partition of Poland the whole region of Greater Poland was annexed by the Kingdom of Prussia and Kalau was incorporated into Kreis Meseritz in 1818. In the 1930s the central parts of the German Festungsfront Oder-Warthe-Bogen military defence (Werkgruppe Scharnhorst) were laid out west of the village, they were overcome by Soviet Red Army forces during the Vistula–Oder Offensive on 29/30 January 1945.

After the implementation of the Oder–Neisse line, Kaława became part of the People's Republic of Poland and the remaining German population was expelled. From 1975–98 the village belonged to Gorzów Voivodeship.

References

Villages in Międzyrzecz County